The 1934 Saint Louis Billikens football team was an American football team that represented Saint Louis University as an independent during the 1934 college football season. In its first season under head coach Cecil Muellerleile, the team compiled a 3–3–2 record and was outscored by a total of 67 to 59. The team played its home games at Edward J. Walsh Memorial Stadium in St. Louis.

Schedule

References

Saint Louis
Saint Louis Billikens football seasons
Saint Louis Billikens football